A brassard or armlet is an armband or piece of cloth or other material worn around the upper arm; the term typically refers to an item of uniform worn as part of military uniform or by police or other uniformed persons. Unit, role, rank badges or other insignia are carried on it instead of being stitched into the actual clothing. The brassard, when spread out, may be roughly rectangular in shape, where it is worn merely around the arm; it may also be a roughly triangular shape, in which case the brassard is also attached to a shoulder strap.  The term is originally French, deriving from bras meaning "arm".

Brassards are also used with the uniforms of organizations which are not military but which are influenced by and styled upon the military, such as police, emergency services, volunteer services, or militaristic societies and political parties.

A brassard is often used:
 to temporarily attach insignia, such as rank, to clothing not normally bearing insignia (such as civilian clothing or a military mechanic's coveralls); For example, when French police officers work in plainclothes or are off-duty and carrying a firearm, they must wear a red ‘Police’ brassard.
 to temporarily attach insignia to a uniform for a limited time, such as the insignia for an "officer of the day" or "duty officer"; or for uniforms expected to have a high turnover of either wearer or insignia borne, such as those of cadets or other youth organizations. Brassards worn by Red Cross personnel fall under this category. Brassards are often used in this manner by military police, the brassard being both a badge of authority and identification.

Brassard (also "brassart" or "brasset") is also used to refer to pieces of armour worn to cover the entire arm (encompassing vambrace, rerebrace, and possibly a couter).

See also
Armband
Arm ring
Black armband

References

 

Military insignia
Military uniforms
Western plate armour
Armbands